The 2017 Southern Conference men's soccer tournament, was the 12th edition of the tournament. It determined the Southern Conference's automatic berth into the 2017 NCAA Division I Men's Soccer Championship.

Defending champions, Mercer, successfully defended their title, beating UNC Greensboro in the final.

Seeding 
All six teams in the SoCon qualified for the tournament. The teams were seeded based on their regular season conference record.

Bracket

See also 
2017 Southern Conference men's soccer season
2017 NCAA Division I men's soccer season
2017 NCAA Division I Men's Soccer Championship
Southern Conference Men's Soccer Tournament
2017 Southern Conference Women's Soccer Tournament

References

External links 
2017 SoCon Tournament Central

Southern Conference Men's Soccer
Southern Conference Men's Soccer Tournament